Why Girls Love Sailors is an American comedy short silent film directed by Fred Guiol for Hal Roach Studios. It stars Stan Laurel and Oliver Hardy before they had become the comedy team of Laurel and Hardy. It was shot during February 1927 and released July 17, 1927, by Pathé Exchange. It was considered a lost film until the 1980s.

Plot

The film starts with the loading of a ship called the Merry Maiden. Oliver is first mate on the ship and described as "a bully, the nastiest crew member, after the captain of course". He features a beard and a mustache, rather than his usual solitary mustache. Stan plays Willie Brisling a guy who is engaged to Nelly and they are in love. The captain leaves his ship, he sees Nelly and decides he wants her. Stan has a tattoo of a ship on his chest and shows it to the captain. The captain pours a jug of water down Stan's sweater and abducts Nelly. The captain takes Nelly to his ship and Stan sneaks on board to rescue her. Oliver starts to look for Stan. Stan decides to save Nelly his last hope is to get rid of the crew, one by one. Stan disguises himself as a prostitute. The crew begin to fall for his charms. Stan calls one of the crewmen over, he hits the crewman with a cosh and knocks him out. Then he throws the cosh at Oliver, who thinks the crewman threw the cosh. Oliver throws the crewman |overboard, this is repeated until all of the crew are in the sea.

Nelly is being harassed by the captain. The captain's wife appears at the ship. The Captain takes a fancy to Stan. The wife appears as Stan is sat in the captain's lap. The captain's wife takes a gun and goes to shoot her husband. Stan stops her and takes off his wig. Stan says "this was a test to see if you really love your husband". The captain and wife begin to make up. But then the captain indicates he's going to "deal with Stan later". Stan is peeved, he opens the door and Nelly appears. Stan indicates the captain has been up to no good with Nelly and that four other loose women have already gone. The captain's wife is furious, Stan gives her the gun back. Stan and Nelly leave. There is a gunshot in the room. The wife, still angry, sees Stan and Nelly through a porthole and shoots them. Stan and Nelly's clothes fall off revealing their underwear.

Cast

Production 
The film marks the first appearance of Anita Garvin in a Laurel and Hardy picture; her involvement in the film was not known until the 1986 rediscovery. Deleted scenes from this film included actress Anna May Wong.

Lost film found 
After its initial run in 1927 and particularly after talkies eclipsed silent films marketability, Why Girls Love Sailors went missing in the U.S. for nearly fifty years. Cinémathèque Française had a 16mm print, which French film critic Roland Lacourbe saw in 1971, and pronounced it mediocre.

When it was finally published, it was drawn from a 16mm print in a private collection, and only due to the efforts of a private collector in Copenhagen. Laurel and Hardy author Glenn Mitchell is even less impressed by the film than was Lacourbe: "Why Girls Love Sailors is one of several instances where the status of a 'lost' film has been reduced by its rediscovery," he writes. It is available in Europe on VHS and DVD releases, with reconstructed credits. In the United States, both VHS and DVD editions are out of print.

References

External links 

Stills at lordheath.com

1927 films
1927 comedy films
American black-and-white films
American LGBT-related short films
American silent short films
Films directed by Fred Guiol
Laurel and Hardy (film series)
Films with screenplays by H. M. Walker
1920s LGBT-related films
1920s rediscovered films
Rediscovered American films
Silent American comedy films
1920s American films